José Casas Ruiz (born January 10, 1960) is a Mexican professional wrestler (called a Luchador in Spanish) and professional wrestling trainer working for Lucha Libre AAA Worldwide (AAA) under the ring name Negro Casas. He is the son of former wrestler turned referee Pepe Casas, and part of the large Casas wrestling family; brother of professional wrestlers El Felino and Heavy Metal and uncle of Puma, Tiger, Canelo Casas, Rocky Casas, Danny Casas and many more.

Casas has trained several wrestlers, including Mephisto, Kazushige Nosawa, T. J. Perkins, Rocky Romero, and Ricky Marvin. Casas has worked all over the world, making appearances for the World Wrestling Federation (WWF) in the United States of America as well as touring with New Japan Pro-Wrestling (NJPW) in Japan for over a decade.

In Mexico, Casas is known for his work in Consejo Mundial de Lucha Libre (CMLL), wrestling sporadically for the promotion from 1980 until 2023. Casas has also wrestled in Mexico for the Universal Wrestling Association (UWA), World Wrestling Association (WWA) and International Wrestling Revolution Group (IWRG). In 2008 Negro Casas joined with Mr. Niebla and Heavy Metal to form the group La Peste Negra (Spanish for "the Black Plague"), a group that would later be joined by El Felino.

Early life
Casas was born in 1960, the son of professional wrestler Pepe "Tropi" Casas, and grew up around Tlalpan. Casas described his childhood as a happy and normal one, even though his father would be away from home for long stretches as he wrestled all over Mexico and the United States. Casas' father first took him to a wrestling show when Casas was five years old, bringing him to an event across the border in the United States. Casas became hooked on wrestling from the moment he saw the first match, with his first idols being his father, Aníbal and El Solitario. Casas played football, soccer, volleyball and baseball while still in school and even started training in professional wrestling classes taught by his father and Raúl Reyes. José and his brothers, Heavy Metal and El Felino, often sat at ringside during their father's matches, pretending to be upset or cry whenever their father looked like he was getting beat up in the ring, a ploy that their father had taught them to help gain crowd sympathy.

Professional wrestling career

Early career
Casas debut came in 1979 as a bit of a strange turn of events. José Casas was in an arena where his father was supposed to compete when the promoter told Casas that his father had not shown and that he needed the young Casas to fill in for him or he would have Pepe Casas banned from wrestling. Casas wrestled and won his first match using the ring name "Pepe Casas Jr.", wearing street clothes only to discover Pepe Casas and Raúl Reyes waiting in the dressing room. The two had played a joke on Casas to see how he handled himself in the ring. Casas chose the name "Negro Casas" ("Black Casas") as his ring name and decided not to wear a mask. By 1984 Casas had begun working for Universal Wrestling Association, winning the UWA World Lightweight Championship from Black Terry on January 1, 1984. Casas held the championship for 301 days before losing it to El Hijo del Santo. The loss to El Hijo del Santo was part of a long running, very intense storyline between Casas and Hijo del Santo that drew favorable reviews and helped establish both wrestlers as future main eventers. The storyline included Hijo del Santo forcing Negro Casas to be shaved bald after losing a Luchas de Apuestas, or bet match.

In the late 1980s Negro Casas began working for the Mexican-based World Wrestling Association (WWA) where he became the first man to hold the WWA Welterweight Championship, holding it from sometime in 1987 until he was defeated by Tornado Negro on April 14, 1989. Casas regained the title, but only held it briefly before losing again as he was leaving the WWA. Casas returned to the UWA in 1990 and on January 29, 1991, he won the UWA World Middleweight Championship from Super Astro. Casas held the title for 787 days, finally losing it to Último Dragón.

Empresa Mexicana de Lucha Libre/Consejo Mundial de Lucha Libre

Various storylines (1980–2008)
In 1980 Casas worked a low card match at Coliseo Naucalpan against an equally young Fuerza Guerrera, the match was so well liked by the audience that they threw money into the ring to show their appreciation. Promoter Paco Alonso even entered the ring and asked the crowd to show their appreciation for the match they just saw, earning both Negro Casas and Fuerza Guerrera a regular job with Empresa Mexicana de Lucha Libre (EMLL).

By the mid 1990s Casas worked regularly for CMLL and toured Japan several times a year, wrestling for New Japan Pro-Wrestling (NJPW). In April 1994 Casas took part in the first Super J-Cup tournament; he lost to Ricky Fuji in the first round. On December 1, 1995, Negro Casas defeated longtime rival Hijo del Santo in the finals of a tournament to crown a new NWA World Welterweight Championship. Casas held the title for over 200 days, rarely defending until he participated in a tournament to unify 8 lightweight titles in NJPW's J-Crown tournament. Casas put the Welterweight title on the line but lost to Shinjiro Otani in the first round. Casas and El Hijo del Santo resumed their feud in 1997, culminating in another Lucha de Apuestas between the two. Negro Casas once again ended up on the losing side, losing two falls to one in the main event of the CMLL 63rd Anniversary Show. Negro Casas would later state that El Hijo del Santo was one of his favorite rivals and good friends backstage. Following the Apuesta loss Negro Casas and El Hijo del Santo began teaming together in 1998 and in early 1999 the team defeated Bestia Salvaje and Scorpio Jr. by disqualification, but refused to accept the CMLL World Tag Team Championship as they did not win by pinfall. After the refusal the title the two teams faced a few weeks later and this time Casas and Hijo del Santo won by pinfall to claim the title. The team reigned for over 400 days, until El Hijo del Santo left CMLL; forcing Negro Casas to vacate the title. When El Hijo del Santo returned in 2001 the duo picked up where they left off by defeating Último Guerrero and Rey Bucanero to win the tag team championship once again. After 210 days and several title defenses Guerrero and Bucanero finally regained the titles, ending the third and final reign of the Casas/Hijo del Santo team. Following the loss of the tag team title Negro Casas began focusing on his singles career once again, winning the CMLL World Middleweight Championship from Emilio Charles Jr. on April 26, 2004. On August 28, 2005, Negro Casas became a double champion when he won the IWRG Intercontinental Trios Championship, teaming with his brothers El Felino and Heavy Metal to defeat Black Tiger III, Pentagon Black, and El Pantera to win the title. The trios title reign lasted 129 days, ended by the team of Cerebro Negro, Veneno, and Scorpio Jr. In 2006 Negro Casas was teamed up with CMLL's rising star Místico, working together in a style very similar to Casas and Hijo del Santo. The two defeated Averno and Mephisto to win the CMLL Tag Team Championship, Casas' fourth and Místico's first, on April 14, 2006. On September 17, 2006, Negro Casas' 874-day CMLL World Middleweight Championship reign ended at the hands of Averno. Casas and Místico lost the tag team titles to Último Guerrero and Dr. Wagner Jr. on July 13, 2007 but quickly regained them a week later. The team of Último Guerrero and Atlantis finally dethroned the duo, keeping them away from the title in subsequent rematches. On November 11, 2007, Negro Casas won the IWRG Intercontinental Middleweight Championship by defeating Villano III in the finals of a tournament to find a new champion. Casas has not lost the title, but since CMLL and IWRG stopped working together in 2008 he is no longer promoted as the champion with the title technically being inactive.

La Peste Negra (2008–2023)

In July 2008 Mr. Niebla returned to CMLL, forming a group with Negro Casas and Heavy Metal called La Peste Negra (Spanish for "the Black Plague"), a Rudo group that had a more comical approach to wrestling. The trio started wearing large afro wigs, painting their faces black and dancing during their entrances and generally worked a less serious style of match than was unusual, especially for a serious wrestler like Negro Casas. On September 2, 2008, the last Casas brother, El Felinoa turned Rudo as well and joined La Peste Negra. After Felino joined the group Heavy Metal was quietly phased out as he was not comfortable working the comedic style. Felino's wife Princesa Blanca joined the group in early 2009, turning Rudo to work with La Pestre, the turn led to Princesa Blanca winning the Mexican National Women's Championship from Marcela on January 30, 2009. La Pesta Negra's biggest triumph to date is Negro Casas' title win over Místico that brought the CMLL World Welterweight Championship into the group. After the title win, La Peste Negra continued their feud with Místico and his various allies. The feud led to Místico and Negro Casas facing off in a Lucha de Apuesta on the CMLL 76th Anniversary Show, where Casas lost two falls to one and had his hair shaved off. After the match, Místico challenged El Felino, Casas' cornerman, to an Apuesta sometime in the future.

On January 29, 2010, Negro Casas teamed up with La Máscara to participate in CMLL's "Torneo Nacional de Pareja Increíbles" ("National Amazing Pairs tournament"), a tournament where CMLL teams up a Tecnico (La Máscara) and a Rudo (Casas) for a tournament. The two defeated El Texano Jr. and Rouge in the opening round, El Sagrado and Shocker in the second round, and Héctor Garza and Toscano in the semi-final to earn a spot in the final of the tournament. On February 5, 2010, Casas and La Máscara lost to Máscara Dorada and Atlantis in the finals. On February 14, 2010, Casas defeated El Hijo del Fantasma to win the CMLL World Middleweight Championship for the second time. During most of April and into May Negro Casas toured with NJPW in Japan. On May 3, 2010 Casas lost the CMLL World Middleweight title to Jushin Thunder Liger during NJPW's Wrestling Dontaku 2010 show. On October 15, 2010, Charly Manson defeated Negro Casas in a Lucha de Apuesta to take his hair. On February 14, 2012, Casas defeated La Sombra to win the NWA World Historic Welterweight Championship for the first time. On March 2 at Homenaje a Dos Leyendas, Casas and Blue Panther wrestled to a draw in a Lucha de Apuesta and were, as a result, both shaved bald. On October 21, Casas returned to NJPW, when he and Bushi entered the 2012 Super Jr. Tag Tournament as "Grupo Cibernetico". The team was eliminated from the tournament in the first round by Suzuki-gun (Taichi and Taka Michinoku). On December 25, 2012, Negro Casas successfully defended the NWA Historic Welterweight Championship against Guerrero Maya Jr. on a special Christmas show in Arena Mexico after Maya Jr. had defeated Casas in a series of matches leading up to the show. In early 2013 Negro Casas and Guerrero Maya Jr. were teamed up for the 2013 CMLL Torneo Nacional de Parejas Increibles, a tournament where the concept was that rivals or at least wrestlers from opposite sides of the tecnico/rudo divide. The team lost in the first round to eventual tournament winners La Sombra and Volador Jr. On June 2, Casas lost the NWA World Historic Welterweight Championship to Máscara Dorada, ending his reign at 475 days, the longest in the title's history. On January 3, 2014, Casas defeated Titán in the finals to win the 2014 Leyenda de Plata. On February 18, Casas, El Felino and Mr. Niebla defeated La Máscara, Rush and Titán to win the Mexican National Trios Championship. On June 13, Casas and Shocker defeated La Máscara and Rush to win the CMLL World Tag Team Championship. On August 1 at El Juicio Final, Casas lost his hair to Rush in a Lucha de Apuestas. On April 26, 2015, La Peste Negra lost the Mexican National Trios Championship to Los Reyes de la Atlantida (Atlantis, Delta and Guerrero Maya Jr.). On May 22, Casas defeated Dragon Lee to win the 2015 Leyenda de Plata, his second in a row and third overall. On February 14, 2018, CMLL vacated the CMLL World Tag Team Titles due to lack of defences since 2016.

In January 2023, Casas and his wife Dalys la Caribeña departed CMLL.

Lucha Libre AAA Worldwide (2023–present)
On January 21, 2023, Casas and his wife Dalys la Caribeña made their debuts for Lucha Libre AAA Worldwide (AAA), appearing at a AAA television taping in Querétaro. On February 5, at Rey de Reyes, Casas made his AAA in-ring debut, being defeated by Hijo del Vikingo in a four-way Rey de Reyes match qualifier that also involved Myzteziz Jr. and Mecha Wolf.

Personal life
José Casas is a member of an extensive wrestling family, founded by his father Pepe "Tropi" Casas and also consists of his brothers Erick, who wrestles as "Heavy Metal" and El Felino (Jorge Casas), and a brother who is not a professional wrestler. Casas' sister-in-law (Felino's wife) is former Mexican National Women's Champion Princessa Blanca. Casas' wife is the daughter of a Panamanian wrestling promoter that Casas once worked for, currently working for CMLL as well,  using the ring name Dalys la Caribeña. His two daughters are training in Olympic style wrestling, also hoping to turn professional one day. José Casas does not train his daughters, entrusting that task to Ringo Mendoza, Tony Salazar, Arturo Beristain and Franco Colombo. One of Casas' daughters is married to professional wrestler Diamante who works for CMLL. Casas also has two nephews who work as Tiger and Puma, the sons of El Felino. Wrestler Canelo Casas is also credited with being a nephew of Negro Casas, but it is unclear if he is the son of Erick Casas or the son of one of their non-wrestling brothers or sisters.

Championships and accomplishments
Consejo Mundial de Lucha Libre
CMLL World Middleweight Championship (2 times)
CMLL World Tag Team Championship (6 times) – with El Hijo del Santo (3), Místico (2), and Shocker (1)
CMLL World Trios Championship (1 time) – with último Guerrero and Atlantis
CMLL World Welterweight Championship (1 time)
Mexican National Trios Championship (1 time) - with El Felino and Mr. Niebla
NWA World Historic Welterweight Championship (1 time)
NWA World Welterweight Championship (1 time)
Torneo Gran Alternativa (1994) – with Héctor Garza
Leyenda de Plata (2000, 2014, 2015)
Copa Bobby Bonales (2010)
International Wrestling Revolution Group
IWRG Intercontinental Middleweight Championship (1 time)
IWRG Intercontinental Trios Championship (1 time) – with El Felino and Heavy Metal
Mexican Provincial Championships
Estado de Guerrero Lightweight Championship (1 time)
Estado de México heavyweight championship (42 times)
Pro Wrestling Illustrated
Ranked No. 33 of the 500 best singles wrestlers of the PWI 500 in 1999
Ranked No. 148 of the top 500 singles wrestlers of the PWI Years in 2003
Universal Wrestling Association
UWA World Lightweight Championship (1 time)
UWA World Middleweight Championship (1 time)
World Wrestling Association
WWA World Welterweight Championship (1 time)
Wrestling Observer Newsletter
Wrestling Observer Newsletter Hall of Fame (Class of 1996)

Luchas de Apuestas record

Footnotes

References

External links
 Consejo Mundial de Lucha Libre (Spanish)
 Online World of Wrestling profile

1960 births
Living people
Mexican male professional wrestlers
Professional wrestling trainers
Professional wrestlers from Mexico City
20th-century professional wrestlers
21st-century professional wrestlers
Mexican National Trios Champions
CMLL World Middleweight Champions
CMLL World Tag Team Champions
CMLL World Welterweight Champions
NWA World Historic Welterweight Champions
NWA World Welterweight Champions
UWA World Middleweight Champions
UWA World Lightweight Champions